Vitorino Nemésio Mendes Pinheiro da Silva (19 December 1901, in Praia da Vitória – 20 February 1978, in Lisbon) was a Portuguese poet, author and intellectual from Terceira, Azores, best known for his novel Mau Tempo No Canal, as well as being a professor in the Faculty of Letters at the University of Lisbon and member of the Academy of Sciences of Lisbon.

Biography 

Vitorino Nemesio was the son of Vitorino Gomes da Silva and Maria da Glória Mendes Pinheiro, and born in Praia da Vitória, on Terceira island, Azores (1901).

His early education did not reflect the academic career that he would have; he encountered many problems as a student and was expelled from secondary school, repeating his fifth year of studies. Of his time in the secondary school in Angra do Heroísmo, Nemésio indicated his fondness for history classes, and attributed this interest to Manuel António Ferreira Deusdado (his history teacher), who introduced him to the social sciences.

At 16 years of age, for the first time, Nemésio travelled to the district capital of Horta, to complete his entry exams for the National School: he was barely able to accomplish a passing mark. He did complete the entry exams in the General Course on 16 July 1918. His stayed in Horta from May to August 1918. On 13 August the newspaper O Telégrafo (although disparagingly referring to Nemésio as a "provincial") published a notice about the young author's first book of poetry, Canto Matinal, which was sent to the editor Manuel Emídio (it would later be published in 1916). While at the school, he contributed to Eco Académico: Semanário dos Alunos do Liceu de Angra and helped to found the magazine Estrela d'Alva: Revista Literária Ilustrada e Noticiosa while completing his studies in Angra.

Although relatively young, Nemesio had already developed republican ideals, having participated in literary, republican, and anarchist-unionist meetings while living in Angra. He was influenced primarily by his friend, Jaime Brasil, five-years his senior (the first intellectual mentor he knew), as well as others, such as the lawyer Luís da Silva Ribeiro and the author-librarian, Gervásio Lima.

In 1918, just before the First World War ended, Horta was a centre of maritime commerce with a vibrant night life. It was an obligatory port-of-call, a place for refurnishing chips and giving time off to the crew. The trans-Atlantic telegraph cable companies had installed themselves in Horta, contributing to a cosmopolitan environment, that much later would inspire his Mau Tempo no Canal, on which he was to begin working after 1939. In 1919, he volunteered for military service in the infantry, enabling him to travel outside the Azores for the first time.

Academia
In Lisbon, he worked as a coordinator for A Pátria, A Imprensa de Lisboa and Última Hora, while completing his secondary school studies in Coimbra (in 1921). He eventually enrolled in the Faculty of Law at the University of Coimbra, where he worked as an editor in the student newspaper. By 1923, he joined the Coimbra Revolta Lodge of the Grand Order of Lusitania, a masonic group.  While working for the magazine Bizâncio, he learnt of his father's death. Three years later (1925), he switched from Law to Social and Applied Sciences in the Faculty of Letters to concentrate on the Historical and Geographic Sciences. During his first trip to Spain (Salamanca, specifically), with the Academic Choir in 1923, he met the Spanish writer, philosopher and republican Miguel Unamuno (1864–1936), a leader in revolutionary humanist theory, and staunch anti-Francist, with whom he would continue to correspond for years. With Afonso Duarte, António de Sousa, Branquinho da Fonseca, Gaspar Simões, among others, he founded the magazine Tríptico. His studies turned to Romance Languages by 1925; at the time, he worked with José Régio, João Gaspar Simões and António de Sousa on the journal Humanidade: Quinzenário de Estudantes de Coimbra.

In Coimbra on 12 February 1926, he married Gabriela Monjardino de Azevedo Gomes, with whom he would have four children: Georgina (November 1926), Jorge (April 1929), Manuel (July 1930) and Ana Paula (at the end of 1931).

In 1930, Nemésio transferred to the Faculty of Letters at the University of Lisbon, where, a year later, he concluded his course in Romance Languages and began offering classes in Italian Literature and, later, Spanish Literature (after 1931). He obtained his Doctorate in 1934 from the University of Lisbon, with his thesis A Mocidade de Herculano Até à Volta do Exílio (English: The Youth of Herculano until His Return from Exile). Between 1937 and 1939, he lectured at the Université Libre de Bruxelles, returning in the last year to the Faculty of Letters in Lisbon.

His most complex, dense and subtle novel, Mau Tempo No Canal, remains one of the primary examples of contemporary Portuguese literature, which he would finally publish in 1944. Encompassing the islands of Faial, Pico, São Jorge and Terceira, the novel evokes the period of 1917-1919, when the author lived in Horta and where people such as Dr. José Machado de Serpa (a Republican senator), Father Nunes da Rosa (professor at the secondary school) and Osório Goulart (poet) were contemporaries. After his seminal work, Nemésis never returned to writing novels; in an unpublished epilogue, under the title Morro autor de um romance único (English: I will die as the author of a single novel), he stated that Mau Tempo No Canal was the high-point in his long literary career.

On visiting Horta for a second time, in 1946, he wrote Corsário das Ilhas (English: The Islands Corsair), in which he reflected on his schooling:

 "I like Horta like loquats. I long nostalgically for who I was, I don't how, when I was here. Everything I imagined and, more or less, was frustrated by was here; but Horta is not just going beyond...Matriz on high, where the homes of the nobility stood and which the Jesuits adapted, and another two or three always cubical, fastidious church convents on high; each points, when I leave, to the parishes of Conceição and Angústias, it is what is needed to complete a good citizenship, white as a bride: Horta."

Thirty years later Nemésio continued to remember the village of Horta as his "first refuge, of patriarchal hospitality and gentility in everything, or for everything".

In 1958, he lectured in Brazil. On 12 September 1971, when he reached the public service retirement age, he gave his final lecture at the Faculty in Lisbon; a period of 40 years of service.

Later life
He authored and presented the television program Se bem me lembro, which contributed to popularising his literary importance, while at the same time directing the newspaper O Dia from 11 December 1975 to 25 October 1976.

He died on 20 February 1978 in Lisbon, at the CUF Hospital, and was laid to rest in his adopted home, Coimbra. Before his death, he asked his son to bury him in the cemetery of Santo António dos Olivais, and that the bells should play the Alleluia.

Public works 
His early literary writings were inspired by the Azores. Afonso Lopes Vireira would later note the presence of "childhood memories, and loves, pains and figures of humility, who in these pages, are alive and obsessed with the sea". Vitorino Nemésio's personal experiences are generally present in his published works, beginning with his volume of stories in Paço do Milhafre (English: Eagle Palace), in 1924. Prefaced by Afonso Lopes Vieira, and later retitled O Mistério do Paço do Milhafre (English: The Mystery of Eagle Palace), the work has been in print since 1949. During his long literary career, the author has never stopped surprising readers. In his novels, for example, he transmitted a sense of originality, in particular, with his descriptions of places and complex characters, in which he was generously human (such as in Varanda de Pilatos, published in 1927, or his volume of novels A Casa Fechada (English: The Closed House), comprising three stories: O Tubarão (English: The Shark), Negócio de Pomba (English: Dove Business) and A Casa Fechada).

Vitorino Nemésio was one of the great writers of contemporary Portuguese literature, receiving in 1965, the Prémio Nacional da Literatura (English: National Literary Prize), as well as the 1974 Montaigne Prize. He was a writer of fiction and poetry, a chronicler, a biographer, a historian of literature, a journalist, a philosopher, a letter writer, a language expert and a television writer. This was ironic in view of his terrible beginnings in the secondary school on Terceira.

Generally regional in his perspectives, his works elaborated on Azorean life, along with sentimental memories of his childhood, revealing a populist preoccupation with simple people who were profoundly human and living through aspects of human suffering. He published biographies, including his doctoral dissertation on Alexandre Herculano, and his biography of Queen Saint Elizabeth of Portugal. He also wrote of his journeys to Brazil, the Azores and Madeira, discussed diverse subjects associated with Portuguese and Brazilian history, including a dissertation on Gil Vicente, and wrote poetry criticism.

Nemésio was also a poet, publish works uninterruptedly from 1916 (Canto Matinal) to 1976 (Era do Átomo Crise do Homem). Óscar Lopes, writing on his poetry, noted two currents of verse in his work Nem toda a Noite a Vida (English: Not All Night Is There Life). The first current is mostly regional; in particular, nostalagia for island life, childhood, adolescences, his father and first forbidden love, which are obvious in O Bicho Harmonioso (English: The Harmonious Beast) and Eu, Comovido a Oeste. In his later works there is a transformation, his themes are more metaphysical and religious in tone; he debated themes of life and death, of being and the search for the meaning of life: purely existentialist philosophy. In addition, the writer cultivates a popular poetry marked by Azorean symbolism, in which he was regularly accused of being a regionalist literary.

Poetry 

 Canto Matinal (1916)
 O Bicho Harmonioso (1938)
 Eu, Comovido a Oeste (1940)
 Festa Redonda (1950)
 Nem Toda a Noite a Vida (1953)
 O Pão e a Culpa (publicada em 1955)
 O Verbo e a Morte (1959)
 Canto de Véspera (1966)
 Sapateia Açoriana, Andamento Holandês e Outros Poemas (1976)

Fiction 

 Paço de Milhafre (1924)
 Varanda de Pilatos (1926)
 Mau Tempo no Canal (1944), which won the Ricardo Malheiros Literary Prize;

Dissertations and Critics 

 Sob os Signos de Agora (1932)
 A Mocidade de Herculano (1934)
 Relações Francesas do Romantismo PortuguêS (1936)
 Ondas Médias (1945)
 Conhecimento de Poesia (1958)

Chronicles 

 O Segredo de Ouro Preto (1954)
 Corsário das Ilhas (1956)
 Jornal do Observador (1974).

Bibliography

References

External links 
 - YouTube
 Vitorino Nemésio

1901 births
1978 deaths
Azorean writers
Portuguese male poets
Portuguese essayists
Portuguese journalists
Male journalists
University of Lisbon alumni
University of Coimbra alumni
People from Praia da Vitória
Portuguese male novelists
20th-century novelists
20th-century Portuguese poets
Male essayists
20th-century essayists
20th-century male writers
20th-century journalists